NGC 360 is a spiral galaxy located approximately 103 million light-years from the Solar System in the constellation Tucana. It was discovered on 2 November 1834 by John Herschel. Dreyer, creator of the New General Catalogue described the object as "extremely faint, very much extended 145°, very little brighter middle."

See also 
 List of NGC objects (1–1000)

References

External links 
 
 
 SEDS

0360
18341102
Tucana (constellation)
Spiral galaxies
Discoveries by John Herschel
003743